

Kringin is a town and a locality in the Australian state of South Australia located in the state’s east about  east of the state capital of Adelaide and about  south of the municipal seat of Loxton.

The government town of Kringin was proclaimed on 25 September 1924 on land on the boundaries of the cadastral units of the hundreds of Kingsford and Peebinga to the immediate north-west of the Kringin Railway Station.  The town was named after the railway station, a stop on the now-closed Peebinga railway line,  and whose name is derived from an aboriginal word meaning “growing” or “springing up.”  The boundaries for the locality were created on 28 September 2000 and includes the site of the Government Town of Kringin which is located in its south-eastern corner adjacent to the Peebinga Conservation Park.

A school operated in the town from 1926 to 1945.  In 1991, it was reported that members of the Vietnam Veterans’ Association were planning to purchase the town and develop it both as holiday accommodation and as a retirement community for Vietnam veterans.

Land use within the locality is mainly concerned with “primary production” while land in its south-east corner located in the protected area, the Peebinga Conservation Park, is zoned for “conservation”.

The 2016 Australian census which was conducted in August 2016 reports that Kringin had a population of zero.

Kringin is located within the federal division of Barker, the state electoral district of Chaffey and the local government area of the District Council of Loxton Waikerie.

References

Towns in South Australia